The Vienna Convention on Succession of States in Respect of Treaties is an international treaty opened for signature in 1978 to set rules on succession of states. It was adopted partly in response to the "profound transformation of the international community brought about by the decolonization process".  It entered into force on 6 November 1996, which was triggered by the succession of the Republic of Macedonia to the treaty giving it the requisite 15 parties.

The treaty has proven to be controversial largely because it distinguishes between "newly independent states" (a euphemism for former colonies) and "cases of separation of parts of a state" (a euphemism for all other new states).  

Article 16 states that newly independent states receive a "clean slate", such that the new state does not inherit the treaty obligations of the colonial power, whereas article 34(1) states that all other new states remain bound by the treaty obligations of the state from which they separated.  Moreover, article 17 states that newly independent states may join multilateral treaties to which their former colonizers were a party without the consent of the other parties in most circumstances, whereas article 9 states that all other new states may only join multilateral treaties to which their predecessor states were a part with the consent of the other parties.

Parties to the convention
As of February 2019, there are 23 state parties which have ratified the convention.  A further 14 states signed the convention but have not ratified it.

List of parties

List of signatory states

See also
Vienna Convention on the Law of Treaties (1969)
Vienna Conventions

References

Vienna Convention on Succession of States in respect of Treaties.
International Law website at the United Nations.
The Vienna Convention on Succession of States in respect of Treaties on the United Nations Audiovisual Library of International Law with an introductory note by Anthony Aust.

Treaties drafted by the International Law Commission
Treaties concluded in 1978
Treaties entered into force in 1996
United Nations treaties
1978 in Austria
Treaties of Bosnia and Herzegovina
Treaties of Croatia
Treaties of Cyprus
Treaties of the Czech Republic
Treaties of Dominica
Treaties of Ecuador
Treaties of Egypt
Treaties of Estonia
Treaties of the Derg
Treaties of Ba'athist Iraq
Treaties of Liberia
Treaties of Montenegro
Treaties of Morocco
Treaties of Moldova
Treaties of Serbia and Montenegro
Treaties of Seychelles
Treaties of Slovakia
Treaties of Slovenia
Treaties of Saint Vincent and the Grenadines
Treaties of North Macedonia
Treaties of Tunisia
Treaties of Ukraine
Treaties of Yugoslavia
Treaty law treaties